The 1971–72 Rheinlandliga was the 20th season of the highest amateur class of the Rhineland Football Association under the name of 1. Amateurliga Rheinland. It was a predecessor of today's Rheinlandliga.

Results
Sportfreunde Eisbachtal became Rheinland Champion. VfB Wissen represented Rhineland at the 1972 German Football Amateur Championship and lost early in the preliminary rounds against MTV Ingolstadt (Bavaria). SSV Mülheim, Germania Metternich and newcomer ESG Betzdorf had to move down to the 2. Amateur league. For the following 1972–73 season, newcomers from the 2. Amateur League were SV Ehrang, BC Ahrweiler and Eintracht Höhr-Grenzhausen and from the Regional league, last years champion, SpVgg Andernach.

References

1972 in association football
Football in Rhineland-Palatinate
1971 in association football